The 2011 Hotan attack was a bomb-and-knife attack that occurred in Hotan, Xinjiang, China on July 18, 2011. According to witnesses, the assailants were a group of 18 young Uyghur men who opposed the local government's campaign against the burqa, which had grown popular among older Hotan women in 2009 but were also used in a series of violent crimes. The men occupied a police station on Nuerbage Street at noon, killing two security guards with knives and bombs and taking eight hostages. The attackers then yelled religious slogans, including ones associated with Jihadism, as they replaced the Chinese flag on top of a police station with another flag, the identity of which is disputed.

After a firefight with police around 1:30 p.m., 14 attackers were killed, and 4 were captured. 6 of the hostages were rescued alive, while 2 were killed in the attack. Local and national governments said the attack was organized terrorism motivated by religious extremism, and found that two of the attackers have links to the militant East Turkestan Islamic Movement (ETIM). A team from China's counter-terrorism office was sent to Hotan to investigate the attack. ETIM acknowledged responsibility for the attack on September 8, as well as for the attacks in Kashgar later that same July. later in September, 6 men received prison or death sentences for their involvement in both attacks.

Background

Hotan is a city of 360,000 people, 96% Uyghur and 3% Han, in Hotan Prefecture, China. Hotan Prefecture is a predominantly agricultural county and the poorest in Xinjiang, so it is a frequent source of migrant workers to wealthier Xinjiang cities like Ürümqi. Uyghurs tend to have less wealth than their Han counterparts; as a result, many Uyghurs are unemployed and subsist on Chinese social welfare benefits. The city receives few domestic tourists because of terrorism fears, but southern Xinjiang officials are trying to integrate the region into the international economy by creating a special economic zone in nearby Kashgar. Hotan had recently celebrated the opening of the city's first passenger-train service in June.

Xinjiang has been experiencing an Islamic revival, manifest in decreased alcohol consumption and increased beard length in Hotan. Most visibly, since the July 2009 Ürümqi riots, many religious Hotan women of an older age began to wear a long face-concealing Islamic garment, which is more similar to the uniform of the female Chechen suicide bomber than to traditional Uyghur attire. Authorities became concerned with the fashion trend after a spate of murders and robberies outside Hotan where the perpetrators wore face-concealing veils, so they ineffectively campaigned to discourage women from wearing the veils, using slogans such as "show off your pretty looks and let your beautiful long hair fly". Uyghur terrorist attacks usually take the form of IEDs and vehicle-borne bombs in heavily policed areas. Compared to the 1990s, such bombings from 2000 onward have tended to claim civilian as well as traditional police and bureaucratic targets.

Attack

According to a subsequent investigation, a group of 18 anti-government religious extremists arrived in Hotan from Kashgar on July 16, 2 days before the attack; they brought "several dozen different knives including cleavers, axes and switchblades" with them. The men, Uyghurs between the age of 20 and 35, prepared for the attack at the local bazaar, buying materials to create explosives. The attack was executed on July 18, around the Iktar Grand Bazaar in the center of Hotan, when the group entered a government building and took several hostages. According to witnesses, the men approached the gates of the Nuerbage (Naarburg) Street police station around noon with weapons concealed in cardboard boxes, stabbing a Uyghur security guard to death when they got close enough. The guard, Memet Eli, was 25 years old and engaged to be married in September. After killing Eli, the men shouted slogans in Uyghur denouncing the government's campaign against the Islamic veil, in what onlookers described as Kashgar and Aksu accents. Variously described as "terrorists", "rioters", or "thugs" in accounts, the men proceeded to storm the police building wielding molotov cocktails, knives, and grenades. Shouting jihadist slogans such as "Allah is the only god!" and "Holy war!" they broke into the police station, wherein they took police hostages, smashed computer hardware and furniture, and set fires. Two Uyghur women submitting forms inside the police office were trapped inside a smoky room before being rescued through the windows by street vendors.

The men proceeded to take down the Chinese flag atop the police station to put up another flag, with conflicting reports about the new flag's design. The government says the flag was black with white Arabic lettering: the Black Standard commonly known as the "black flag of jihad". Residents interviewed by the Financial Times say it was the "blue half-moon flag" used by Xinjiang independence advocates, while a resident quoted in the South China Morning Post said it was black with a crescent. Nuerbage police station chief Abulaiti Maitiniyazi (Ablet Metniyaz) was a witness to the attack. He recalled shouting to the men in Uyghur for a peaceful settlement, but receiving molotov cocktails and rocks in return. A Han  People's Armed Police paramilitary officer was killed by a molotov cocktail when his squad was forcibly entering the ground level. According to Maitiniyazi, it was when the attackers hacked at the civilian hostages' faces, noses and ears with knives with intent to kill that police fatally shot 14 of the assailants and captured the other four for questioning, ending the attack within 90 minutes of the initial break-in. Six of the eight hostages were rescued alive, while two Han women hostages were hacked to death during the operation, and four Uyghurs were hospitalized for non-life-threatening injuries.

Reaction
The Xinjiang regional government called the incident an organized, "long-planned" "terrorist attack", and a team from China's national counter-terrorism office was sent to Hotan to investigate the causes of the violence. Media called it "one of the most serious eruptions of violence" since the July 2009 Ürümqi riots. An expert at the China Institutes of Contemporary International Relations said that the attack aimed to create fear in the public. On July 19, a spokesperson for China's Ministry of Public Security announced that two of the 18 attackers had links to ETIM. Citing the deaths of Uyghur civilians in the attack, a government spokesperson said that the attack was apparently not ethnically motivated. But the environment in the city after the attack bore signs of ethnic tension. Many Han residents of the city feared for their lives, recalling a spate recent violent crimes against Han people by Uyghurs in Hotan. Many businesses owned by Han shut down, and both local and visiting Han are said to have "almost disappeared in the Uygur-dominated areas". On August 13, the elite counterterrorist Snow Leopard Commando Unit was deployed to Hotan and Kashgar to secure the cities ahead of the China-Eurasia Expo in September.

The anti-China pro-Uyghur independence World Uyghur Congress (WUC) in Germany claimed that the attack was preceded by the violent suppression of a peaceful protest two hours earlier. However, the Financial Times interviewed local Han and Uyghur residents, and none of them had any knowledge of a demonstration before the attack. A local government spokesperson also denied that there was a mass protest before the attack. WUC spokesperson Dilxadi Rexiti (also known as Dilxat Raxi) accused the authorities of lying, rhetorically asking "If the attack was premeditated, why didn't the police take precautions".

Several Indian security analysts claimed that Pakistani-based terror groups were linked to the attack. Both the director of the Institute of Central Asia at the Xinjiang Academy of Social Sciences and Chinese counter-terrorist expert Li Wei alluded to the influence of foreign terrorist organizations in the attack  without mentioning any specific country, which The Times of India claimed referred to Pakistan. However, the Chinese government, which has good relations with Pakistan, and the WUC, did not give any remarks on the alleged connection to terrorists based in Pakistan. On September 8, the US-based terrorist monitoring group SITE reported on a video made by ETIM leader Abdul Shakoor Damla claiming responsibility for the July Hotan and Kashgar attacks on behalf of his group. 

On September 14, the Xinjiang Legal Daily reported that 6 men were tried for their involvement in the Hotan and Kashgar attacks. 4 were given death sentences, and 2 were given 19-year jail terms, for charges including "leading and organizing a terror group, manufacturing illegal explosives, intentional homicide, [and] arson". Xinjiang authorities have unveiled a package of policy responses to the attacks to placate Muslim Uyghurs, which include increasing quotas for Uyghur participation in local government and increasing government subsidies for religious schools.

References

Attacks in China in 2011
July 2011 crimes
Mass murder in 2011
Terrorist incidents in China in 2011
Terrorist incidents in China
21st century in Xinjiang
Hotan
People shot dead by law enforcement officers in China
Xinjiang conflict
Islamic terrorism in China
Attacks on police stations in the 2010s
Turkistan Islamic Party
Islamic terrorist incidents in 2011
2011 murders in China